Exhibition Building may refer to:

Jubilee Exhibition Building, Adelaide, Australia
Royal Exhibition Building, Melbourne, Australia

See also 

 Exhibition Stadium, Toronto, Canada